Nicholas H. Nelson (died December 28, 1874) was an American politician from Maryland. He served as a member of the Maryland House of Delegates, representing Harford County from 1867 to 1868.

Career
Nelson was a Democrat. He served as a member of the Maryland House of Delegates, representing Harford County from 1867 to 1868. He was a member of the Harford County Democratic Executive Committee in 1873. He was still a member at the time of his death.

Nelson served on the board of directors of the Mutual Fire Insurance Company of Harford County.

Personal life
Nelson married Elizabeth B. His wife died in 1873. Nelson had at least one son, Thomas H.

Nelson died on December 28, 1874, at the age of 62, at his home near Federal Hill, Baltimore. He was buried at Bethel Church Cemetery.

References

Year of birth uncertain
1810s births
1874 deaths
People from Harford County, Maryland
Democratic Party members of the Maryland House of Delegates
19th-century American politicians